Alexander Forrest (2 April 1905 – 1974) was a Scottish professional footballer who played as a wing half. Son of Alexander Forrest and Marion Bulloch. Alexander married Eliza Ann Sneddon Dick (1910–1989) 23 October 1928 at Hamilton, Lanark, Scotland

References

1905 births
Year of death missing
Association football wing halves
Bo'ness F.C. players
Burnley F.C. players
Chesterfield F.C. players
Scottish footballers
Footballers from Hamilton, South Lanarkshire
English Football League players